Vashti Thomas (21 April 1990) is a track and field athlete who competes in the 100 metre hurdles and long jump. Thomas won the 100 metres hurdles at the 2013 World University Games in Kazan, Russia, clocking 12.61 seconds, a games record.

Thomas, whose father is of Panamanian descent, represented Panama at the 2014 Central American and Caribbean Games in Xalapa, Mexico, where she finished 7th in the long jump with a leap of 5.87m.

Statistics

Personal bests

International competitions

References

External links

Athletics at the 2013 Summer Universiade
List of Universiade records in athletics

1990 births
Living people
American female sprinters
American female hurdlers
American female long jumpers
American people of Panamanian descent
Track and field athletes from San Jose, California
Medalists at the 2013 Summer Universiade
Universiade gold medalists for the United States
Universiade medalists in athletics (track and field)
Competitors at the 2014 Central American and Caribbean Games
Central American and Caribbean Games competitors for Panama
Panamanian female hurdlers
21st-century American women